Scientists and Engineers for Johnson–Humphrey was a group of prominent scientists consisting of U.S. President Dwight D. Eisenhower's second adviser George Kistiakowsky, Kennedy adviser Jerome Wiesner and many scientists that took part in the Manhattan project. This group's sole purpose was to make sure that Barry Goldwater, whom Nobel Laureate Harold Urey called a "blustery, threatening man", was not elected president.

References

Political history of the United States
Political advocacy groups in the United States
1964 in the United States